The Pine Creek Indian Reservation is the home of the Nottawaseppi Huron Band of Potawatomi (NHBP), a federally-recognized tribe of Potawatomi in the United States. The reservation headquarters is located at 1485 Mno-Bmadzewen Way, between Fulton, Michigan and Athens, Michigan. The historic structures on the reservation were listed on the National Register of Historic Places in 1973.

History
In 1838, members of the Potawatomi nation were forcibly removed from local lands to Kansas, in an operation known as the Potawatomi Trail of Death. During this removal, a group of Tribal Members escaped and returned to their native lands in Michigan. In 1845, Chief Moguago purchased a 120-acre parcel of land along the Pine Creek, and established the Pine Creek Indian Reservation. With the help of Europeans in nearby Athens, the Potawatomi constructed several houses and a school.

References

		

National Register of Historic Places in Calhoun County, Michigan
Buildings and structures completed in 1845
Nottawaseppi Huron Band of Potawatomi
Anishinaabe reservations and tribal-areas in the United States
Native American tribes in Michigan